Helen A. Manville (Wood; pen name Nellie A. Mann; August 3, 1839 – 1912) was an American poet and litterateur of the long nineteenth century. Under the pen name of "Nellie A. Mann", she contributed largely for leading periodicals east and west, and obtained a national reputation as a writer of acceptable verse. At the height of her fame, she decided to stop using the pen name and assume her own. She succeeded in making both names familiar, virtually winning laurels for two cognomens, when ill-health required a pause in her literary work. A collection of her poems was published in 1875, under the title of Heart Echoes, which contained a small proportion of her many verses.

Early years
Helen Adelia Wood was born in New Berlin, New York, August 3, 1839. Her father was Col. Artemus Wood. She inherited literary talent from her mother, several members of whose family won local celebrity, and who were connected with the Carys, from whom Alice and Phebe were descended, and also the house of Douglas, whose distinguished representative was Stephen.

Accompanying her father as Helen Wood, she removed to the West at an early day, and there she obtained her education.

Career
For many years, Manville's pen name was "Nellie A. Mann", under which she contributed to leading periodicals. Renouncing her pen name, she assumed her own, and in 1875, published a collection of her poems entitled, Heart Echoes, which contained a small portion of her verse, for she had been a voluminous writer.

Style and themes
The chief characteristics of her poetry are natural melody, smoothness of versification and exalted sentiment, the expression of a mind filled with refined and uplifting thoughts. Her spirituality was pronounced, and an abiding faith in a supreme wisdom, whose dictations proceed from infinite love, carried many a message of comfort to sorrowing hearts, and inspired strangers to become her grateful friends. This quality of sympathy and understanding of others' trials and sorrows is peculiar to her verse and to the earnest sincere womanliness of the woman herself.

Personal life
After she married Marvin Madison Monroe “M.M.” Manville (1829-1904), she lived in La Crosse, Wisconsin. She had one child, the poet, Marion Manville Pope. Manville died in 1912 during a visit with her daughter in Buenos Aires, Argentina, and was burled in La Crosse.

Selected works

By Nellie A. Mann
 "Sunlight", Ballou's Dollar Monthly Magazine, 1868

By Helen A. Manville
 Heart Echoes, 1875

References

Attribution

Bibliography

External links
  
 

1839 births
1912 deaths
19th-century American poets
19th-century American women writers
19th-century pseudonymous writers
Pseudonymous women writers
Writers from La Crosse, Wisconsin
People from New Berlin, New York
American women poets
Poets from New York (state)
Poets from Wisconsin
Wikipedia articles incorporating text from A Woman of the Century